Nacissela Cristina de Oliveira Maurício (born 2 June 1980) is a former Angolan professional basketball player. A 6'3/1.88m power forward, Maurício plays at club level for Angolan side Primeiro de Agosto. Mauricio was also a member of the Angola women's national basketball team at the FIBA Africa Championship for Women 2007 and FIBA World Olympic Qualifying Tournament for Women 2008. She was part of the Angolan team that participated in the 2012 Summer Olympics.  Mauricio has played professionally in Spain and Portugal.

Achievements

References

External links
 

1980 births
Living people
Angolan women's basketball players
Basketball players at the 2012 Summer Olympics
Olympic basketball players of Angola
C.D. Primeiro de Agosto women's basketball players
CAB Madeira players
Angolan expatriate basketball people in Portugal
Angolan expatriate basketball people in Spain
Basketball players from Luanda
Power forwards (basketball)
African Games silver medalists for Angola
African Games medalists in basketball
Competitors at the 2007 All-Africa Games